Love Is All  may refer to:

Bands
Love Is All (band), Swedish indie rock band

Films
Love is All (2007 film), Dutch film
Love Is All (2014 film), a documentary film by Kim Longinotto

Songs
"Love Is All", a song by The Action
"Love Is All", a song by Air Supply from The Christmas Album
"Love Is All", a song by Chantal Kreviazuk
"Love Is All", a song by Marc Anthony from Marc Anthony
"Love Is All", a song by The Rapture from Echoes
"Love Is All", a song by Red Hurley
"Love Is All" (Roger Glover song), 1974, featuring Ronnie James Dio
"Love Is All", a song by Sizzla from Be I Strong
"Love Is All", a song by Tallest Man on Earth from The Wild Hunt
"Love Is All", a song by Yanni from Tribute
"Love Is All...", a song by Infernal from Fall from Grace
"Love Is All (Shine Your Light on Me)", a song by Roxette from Crash! Boom! Bang!